West Ridge Mall is an enclosed shopping mall in Topeka, Kansas. The mall has three open anchor stores: Dillard's, Furniture Mall of Kansas, and JCPenney. There are two vacant anchors that were formerly Sears and Burlington. It is the third largest enclosed mall in the state of Kansas, behind Oak Park Mall in Overland Park and Towne East Square in Wichita.

History
The mall opened in 1988 under the development of Melvin Simon & Associates. Vanna White made a guest appearance at the ribbon-cutting ceremony. Original tenants included JCPenney, Dillard's, Sears, which closed in September 2018, and The Jones Store. Montgomery Ward would add a store in 1990. It also included a movie theater called the West Ridge 6, which had a Baskin-Robbins inside.

Montgomery Ward closed at the mall in 2001, due to their bankruptcy. Another original tenant, Old Country Buffet, closed in 2003, followed by the movie theater in 2005. The Montgomery Ward building was briefly used for an exhibit by the Kansas International Museum, and became Burlington Coat Factory in 2007 and closed in January 2018. Macy's acquired The Jones Store's parent company in 2006, thus returning Macy's to Topeka after the chain's downtown store closed in 1986. The Macy's closed in 2012. The former Macy's became Furniture Mall of Kansas in late 2013.

The mall was sold to the Kohan Retail Investment Group in late 2021.

References

External links

Shopping malls in Kansas
Shopping malls established in 1988
Buildings and structures in Topeka, Kansas
Tourist attractions in Topeka, Kansas
1988 establishments in Kansas
Kohan Retail Investment Group